Buntley Bluff is a prominent rock cliff  long, just northward of Cape Lankester at the mouth of Mulock Glacier. It was mapped by the United States Geological Survey from tellurometer surveys and from Navy air photos, 1959–63, and named by the Advisory Committee on Antarctic Names for Ensign Ronald E. Buntley, Civil Engineer Corps, U.S. Navy, in charge of personnel at the air strip, Williams Field, McMurdo Sound in U.S. Navy Operation Deepfreeze, 1964.

References 

Cliffs of the Ross Dependency
Hillary Coast